This article lists people who were elected Fellow of the Royal Society in 2017.

Fellows

Yves-Alain Barde
 Tony Bell
 Christopher Bishop
 Neil Burgess
 Keith Beven
 Wendy Bickmore
 Krishna Chatterjee
 James R. Durrant
 Warren East
 Tim Elliott
 Anne Ferguson-Smith
 Jonathan M. Gregory
 Mark Gross
 Roy M. Harrison
 Gabriele C. Hegerl
 Edward C. Holmes
 Richard Houlston
 E. Yvonne Jones
 Subhash Khot
 Julia King, Baroness Brown of Cambridge
 Stafford Lightman
 Yadvinder Malhi
 Andrew N. J. McKenzie
 Gerard J. Milburn
 Anne Neville
 Alison Noble
 Andrew Orr-Ewing
 David J. Owen
 Lawrence Paulson
 Josephine Pemberton
 Sandu Popescu
 Sarah (Sally) Price
 Anne Ridley
 David C. Rubinsztein
 Gavin Salam
 Nigel Shadbolt
 Angus Silver
 Gordon Douglas Slade
 Jennifer Thomas
 Peter Smith
 Nicola Spaldin
 Jonathan P. Stoye
 John Sutherland
 J. Roy Taylor
 Patrick Vallance
 Susanne von Caemmerer
 Hugh Christian Watkins
 Roger L. Williams
 Kenneth H. Wolfe
 Andrew W. Woods

Honorary fellows
 David Neuberger, Baron Neuberger of Abbotsbury

Foreign members

 Max Dale Cooper
 Whitfield Diffie
 Robert H. Grubbs
 Hideo Hosono
 Marcia McNutt
 Ginés Morata
 Robert O. Ritchie
 Thomas C. Südhof
 G. David Tilman
 Susan R. Wessler

References

2017
2017 in the United Kingdom
2017 in science